Team Banco Guayaquil–Ecuador is an Ecuadorian cycling team established in 2022.

Team roster

References

UCI Continental Teams (America)
Cycling teams based in Ecuador
Cycling teams established in 2022